Joanna Jackson (born 1994), known professionally as Sloan Peterson is an Australian singer/songwriter from Sydney, New South Wales. She initially grew up in Los Angeles, however she moved to Sydney as a teenager. Sloan signed a record deal with Warner Music Australia in 2020.

Career
Joannah released her debut EP Midnight Love in 2017 and her album Midnight Love, Vol 2 in 2019.

Discography

Albums

EP's

Singles

References

1994 births
21st-century Australian singers
Australian musicians
Living people
Musicians from Sydney